Rotenburg is a district (Landkreis) in Lower Saxony, Germany. It is landlocked by (from the north and clockwise) the districts of Stade, Harburg, Heidekreis, Verden, Osterholz and Cuxhaven.

History

In medieval times the region was part of the bishoprics of Bremen and Verden. After the Protestant Reformation the bishoprics became secular principalities, colloquially called Bremen-Verden, and finally parts of the Kingdom of Hanover.

The present district was established in 1977 by merging the former districts of Rotenburg and Bremervörde.

Geography

The Wümme River runs through the district from east to west. The marshy area to both sides of the river is called the Wümmeniederung (Wümme Depression).

Coat of arms

The coat of arms displays:
 a lion carrying a cross; the lion was the heraldic animal of Hanover, the cross is symbolising the Prince-Bishopric of Verden
 two criss-crossed keys from the arms of the Prince-Archbishopric of Bremen

Towns and municipalities

References

External links

Official website (German)

 
Districts of Lower Saxony